Emperor Taizong Receiving the Tibetan Envoy (also called 步辇图, Bùniǎn Tú ) is a painting on silk by Yan Liben to show the friendly encounter between the Tang dynasty and Tibet. Bunian Tu is in The Palace Museum in Beijing.

As with other very early Chinese paintings, the scroll in Beijing is probably a faithful later copy of Yan Liben's original, perhaps from the Song dynasty, but the Imperial collectors' seals and added comments show that it was very highly valued from at least the start of the 14th century.

Background
In the seventh century, Tibet grew stronger and stronger. In 634, Songtsen Gampo sent an envoy to Chang'an, the capital of the Tang dynasty, to propose a marriage. Emperor Taizong of Tang accepted the proposal and decided to give him his daughter Princess Wencheng in marriage. In 641, Gar Tongtsen Yülsung (祿東贊), the Prime Minister of Songtsen Gampo, came to Chang'an to accompany the princess back to Tibet. She brought with her many vegetable seeds, tea, books, and craftsmen which played a very important role in the Tibetan cultural and economical development.

Characters in the painting
The emperor sits on the sedan surrounded by maids holding fans and canopy. He looks composed and peaceful. On the left, one person in red is the official in the royal court. The envoy stands aside seriously and holds the emperor in awe. The last person is an interpreter.

References

Tang–Tibet relations
Song dynasty paintings
Emperor Taizong of Tang
641
7th-century paintings
Tang dynasty paintings